The Ministry of Finance (Arabic: وزارة المالية) is a cabinet ministry of Yemen responsible for public finances.

List of ministers

See also 
Politics of Yemen

References 

Government ministries of Yemen
Economy of Yemen
Yemen